CMCC may refer to:

 Canadian Memorial Chiropractic College
 Canadian Music Creators Coalition
 Central Maine Community College
 China Mobile Communications Corporation
 Euro-Mediterranean Center on Climate Change, Italy